Events from the year 1771 in Canada.

Incumbents
Monarch: George III

Governors
Governor of the Province of Quebec: Guy Carleton
Governor of Nova Scotia: Lord William Campbell
Commodore-Governor of Newfoundland: John Byron
Governor of St. John's Island: Walter Patterson

Events
 July 17 –  Massacre at Bloody Falls: Chipewyan chief Matonabbee traveling as the guide to Samuel Hearne on his Arctic overland journey, massacre a group of unsuspecting Inuit.
 Captain James Cook completes his first voyage around the world.
 Lieutenant Governor Michael Francklin of Nova Scotia travels to northern England to seek immigrants to replace those displaced by the Acadian expulsion.

Births
 January 19: Thomas Talbot, army and militia officer, settlement promoter, office holder, and politician (d.1853) 
 June 20: Thomas Douglas, 5th Earl of Selkirk, colonizer and author (d.1820)

Full date unknown
 James Bardin Palmer, land agent, lawyer, office holder, and politician (d.1833)

Deaths
 December 23 : Marie-Marguerite d'Youville, grey nun (b.1701)

Historical documents
Quebec landslide caused by underground water flow buries carriage, horses and driver, and house and barn, and forms 3-acre bank blocking river

Reward of 200 Spanish dollars for information leading to conviction of "murderers" of district deputy provost marshal Jacob Rowe

Reward of $8 offered for return of "a Sailor Negro Slave named Pompey[...]lately bought of Mr. Perras, Merchant" in Quebec City

Just paid, Pointe-aux-Trembles woman stops robber by throwing money into snow, at which he lays down pistols to pick up cash and she shoots him

Mr. Prenties's Long Room will be venue for public concert and ball with tea, coffee and cards; tickets ($1) available from Band of the 10th Regiment

Cryptic news from Montreal mentions "greatest Harmony and the best Understanding[...]between both Sexes [and] Black and White mingling together"

Reward for lost "Pinchbeck chased" watch with "a Steel Chain and two Cornelian Seals, one a Bust set in Gold, the other a Ship set in Pinchbeck"

Newfoundland governor has "fresh instructions" to deny French cod fishers' claims to harbours, fishing works etc. (and salmon and whaling rights)

George Cartwright describes Inuit snow house (complete with skylight and interior icicles that in lamp light form "radiant diamonds")

"I was greatly pleased with their method" - Cartwright on Inuit way to cure codfish without salt (called "pipshy" or "jerking;" note: C. calls Inuit "Indians")

"The most perfect good humour prevailed" - Cartwright watches Inuit women dressing skins, jerking fish, making clothing etc. as they sing and dance

Samuel Hearne's Indigenous companions massacre Inuit along Coppermine River ("Bloody Falls")

Hearne explains what makes their women attractive to "Northern Indians," and notes extremes of hardship (including punishment) women endure

Hearne finds few people live in region just west of Hudson Bay because they know some areas will not even support travellers just passing through

Hearne witnesses attempts to cure illness of Indigenous people by what he calls "conjurers," and regrets making fun of them

Hearne describes source and uses of copper by "Copper Indians" (plus story of woman who introduced copper to them)

Hearne gives "the real state and œconomy" of beavers, contradicting many falsehoods published by other writers (plus note on beavers as pets)

Hearne describes deer pound, which can be 1 mile around with entrance funnel 2–3 miles long, and states opinion on users' affluence and indolence

"Every thing they make is executed with a neatness not to be excelled by the most expert mechanic" - Northern Indians' small canoe and its uses

References 

 
Canada
71